Jiaoqu may refer to the following locations in the People's Republic of China:

Jiaoqu, Jiamusi, Heilongjiang
Jiaoqu, Yangquan, Shanxi

zh:郊区